Events from the year 1837 in Denmark.

Incumbents
 Monarch – Frederick VI
 Prime minister – Otto Joachim

Events
 7 April - C.A. Reitzel publishes Hans Christian Andersen's Fairy Tales Told for Children. First Collection. Third Booklet (Eventyr, fortalte for Børn. Første Samling. Tredie Hefte. 1837) containing fairytales such as The Little Mermaid and The Emperor's New Clothes.

Undated
 The artost Emil Bærentzen founds his own printing business as Em. Bærentzen & Co.'s Lithografiske Institut.

Cilture

Music
 B. S. Ingemann publishes Morgensange for Børn with seven morning songs for children as well as Foraarssang ("Storken sidder paa Bondens Tag;"),

Births
18 March — Marie Christine Björn, ballet dancer (born 1763)
 21 April – Fredrik Bajer, writer (died 1922)
 5 September – Janus la Cour, painter (died 1909)

Deaths
 7 January – Erich Erichsen, merchant and ship-owner (born (1752)
 27 November  – Salomon Soldin, publisher and writer (born 1774)

References

 
1830s in Denmark
Denmark
Years of the 19th century in Denmark